Elanne Kong (born 30 September 1987) is a Hong Kong actress and singer. On 15 May 2020, she announced that she was changing her stage name from Elanne Kwong Yeuk-lam to Elanne Kwong Yee-ching. On 11 September 2021, she announced that she changed to her former stage name Elanne Kwong Yeuk-lam again.

Discography
 Innocent (EP) (2007)
 Shining (Debut Album) (2008)
 Show You (EP) (2009)
 Elanne Kwong (EP) (2011)
 天空之樹 (2012)

Filmography

TV series

Film

Awards
 (2010) Next Magazine TV Award – Most Promising Female Artiste

References

External links

 Official Yahoo! Blog of Elanne Kong
 Elanne Kwong at Sina Twitter
 
 
 

1987 births
Living people
Chinese female models
Hong Kong film actresses
Hong Kong female models
Hong Kong television actresses
People from Xiamen
Actresses from Fujian
Hong Kong Christians
21st-century Hong Kong women singers